Legends of Anika, is a 1954 Yugoslav drama film directed by Vladimir Pogačić.

The film is based on the same-titled short novel penned by the Nobel Prize-winning Yugoslav author Ivo Andrić, continuing Pogačić's series of screen adaptations of literary works by local authors (it was preceded by his critically acclaimed 1953 film Perfidy, which was itself based on a play by Ivo Vojnović).

It was the first Yugoslav film which had a cinema release in the United States, where it premiered on 18 April 1956.

References

External links

Legends of Anika at Filmski-Programi.hr 

1954 films
1954 drama films
Serbo-Croatian-language films
Films directed by Vladimir Pogačić
Yugoslav drama films
Ivo Andrić
Yugoslav black-and-white films